William John McLean (9 July 1918, Katanning, Western Australia – 9 November 1963, Halton Camp, Wendover, Buckinghamshire) was a British bobsledder who competed in the late 1940s. He finished seventh in the four-man event at the 1948 Winter Olympics in St. Moritz.

References
British Olympic Association profile
1948 bobsleigh four-man results
William McLean's profile at Sports Reference.com

1918 births
1963 deaths
Olympic bobsledders of Great Britain
Bobsledders at the 1948 Winter Olympics
British male bobsledders
People from Katanning, Western Australia